A lockpick is a tool used in lockpicking.

Lockpick may also refer to:
 Earwig Lockpicker, a fictional character in the Kender fantasy race
 Remo Lockpick, another fictional Kender character, uncle to Tasslehoff Burrfoot
 Lockpick Pornography, a 2005 novella by Joey Comeau
 LockPick Entertainment, developer/publisher of the video game Dreamlords
 The Lockpicker, a 2016 Canadian drama film

See also 
 Pick (disambiguation)